Dilli Jung Thapa (1894 – 1946) was a chief engineer and colonel of Nepalese Army. He was the son of colonel Harsh Jung Thapa and grandson of governor (Badahakim) of eastern Nepal colonel Gajraj Singh Thapa, he was the chief designer of Nepal's first highway tunnel carved through the inner terai between Hetauda and Amlekhganj.

Notable works
He gained his engineering degree from then Thomason College of Civil Engineering, Roorkee, British India. He was the pioneer engineer during the Rana regime. He is also known for reconstruction of the damaged Rana Durbars, Chandra irrigation canal in Saptari district, urban planning of Rajbiraj city based on replica of Jaipur, India, Nepal first ropeway cargo between Kathmandu and Hetauda and Charkhal adda.

References

Nepalese architects
Nepalese engineers
People from Kathmandu
1894 births
1946 deaths
20th-century engineers